Timothy Joseph Harrington (December 19, 1918 – March 23, 1997) was an American clergyman of the Roman Catholic Church. He served as bishop of the Diocese of Worcester in Massachusetts from 1983 to 1994.  He previously served as an auxiliary bishop of the same diocese from 1968 to 1983.

Biography

Early life 
Timothy Harrington was born on December 19, 1918, in Holyoke, Massachusetts.  He graduated from the College of the Holy Cross in Worcester, Massachusetts in 1941. Harrington studied at the Grand Seminary of Montreal in Montreal, Quebec, before returning to Boston, where he earned a Master of Social Work degree from Boston College.

Priesthood 
Harrington was ordained to the priesthood for the Diocese of Worcester by Bishop Thomas O'Leary on January 19, 1946. He then served as a curate at St. Bernard's Parish in Worcester until 1951.  That year, Harrington became chaplain at Nazareth Home for Boys in Leicester, Massachusetts and began work with Catholic Charities. He served as director of the House of Our Lady of the Way (1957–1960) and director of Catholic Charities (1960–1968).  Harrington was named a papal chamberlain by Pope John XXIII in 1960.

Auxiliary Bishop and Bishop of Worcester 
On April 2, 1968, Harrington was appointed as an auxiliary bishop of the Diocese of Worcester and titular bishop of Rusuca by Pope Paul VI. He received his episcopal consecration on July 2, 1968, from Bishop Bernard Flanagan, with Bishops John Wright and Christopher Weldon serving as co-consecrators. Harrington became chief financial officer of the diocese in 1968, and was named chancellor in 1975. 

Harrington was appointed as the third bishop of Worcester by Pope John Paul II on September 1, 1983. His installation took place at the Cathedral of St. Paul in Worcester on October 13, 1983.

Retirement 
Upon reaching the mandatory retirement age of 75, Harrington submitted his letter of resignation as bishop of the Diocese of Worcester to John Paul II in December 1993. The pope accept his resignation was accepted on October 27, 1994, and named Bishop Daniel Reilly as his successor. 

Timothy Harrington died on March 23, 1997, in Worcester at age 78.

See also

References

1918 births
1997 deaths
People from Holyoke, Massachusetts
College of the Holy Cross alumni
Boston College Graduate School of Social Work alumni
20th-century Roman Catholic bishops in the United States
Roman Catholic bishops of Worcester, Massachusetts
American Roman Catholic clergy of Irish descent